Lagendijk is a Dutch surname. Notable people with the surname include:

 Joost Lagendijk (born 1957), Dutch politician
 Ger Lagendijk (1941–2010), Dutch footballer
 Ad Lagendijk (born 1947), Dutch physicist

Dutch-language surnames